Agustin Ortega (born December 29, 1992) is an Argentine football player.

Playing career
Agustin Ortega played for J3 League club; Blaublitz Akita in 2015 season.

References

External links

1992 births
Living people
Argentine footballers
J3 League players
Blaublitz Akita players
Association football midfielders